"Beyond the Invisible" is a 1996 song by German musical project Enigma. It was the first of only two singles taken from their third album, Le Roi est mort, vive le Roi! (1996). A remake of the song was released by Scooter in 2011.

Production 
In "Beyond the Invisible", Sandra Cretu again provides the opening vocals, Michael Cretu sings lead vocals.  The track also includes samples of a Latvian folk ensemble Rasa song Sajāja Bramaņi and a Gregorian chant (Isaiah 64:9-11) from "Gregoriani Cantus" by Pierre Kaelin.  Most of the tracks on Le Roi Est Mort, Vive Le Roi! include both Gregorian chants and tribal chants, reminiscent of their first and second albums, MCMXC a.D. and The Cross of Changes.

Release 
The 4 and 5-track versions of the single also contain "Light of Your Smile", which is not on the parent album, Le Roi est mort, vive le Roi!.

Critical reception 
Larry Flick from Billboard described the song as "a soothing foray into the land of Gregorian chants and hypnotic new age melodies." He added, "The track gets its primary movement from a quietly knocking electro-funk beat and a subtle undercurrent of guitars. A nice fit for a variety of radio formats, this track will sound particularly good right next to the equally plush rhythm-pop musings of Robert Miles." A reviewer from Music Week rated it four out of five, writing, "Hypnotic ethnic chanting (this time from a Latvian choir), a super catchy melody and a bit of opera add up to another surefire global smash." The magazine also noted that "Michael Cretu is in fine voice on a strong single that has touches of Pink Floyd. A very different sound that will find fans given enough radio exposure."

Music video 
The accompanying music video for the song was directed by Julien Temple and features two ice dancers (the Finnish ice dance couple Susanna Rahkamo and Petri Kokko) skating in a forest.  The video was shot in Savernake Forest, Marlborough, Wiltshire, United Kingdom. The ice rink was constructed especially for the video and took over a week to freeze. Simon Scotland, line producer on the video, subsequently used the title Beyond the Invisible as the name for his Home Cinema and Entertainment company.

Track listing 
All lyrics written by Michael Cretu and David Fairstein, music by Cretu.

 2-track CD single
 "Beyond the Invisible (Radio Edit)" – 4:30
 "Almost Full Moon" –  3:40

 3-track CD single
 "Short Radio Edit" – 3:42
 "Radio Edit" – 4:30
 "Album Version" – 5:05

 4-track CD single
 "Beyond The Invisible (Radio Edit)" – 4:30
 "Almost Full Moon" – 3:42
 "Beyond The Invisible (Album Version)" – 5:05
 "Light of Your Smile" – 5:10

 5-track CD single
 "Beyond the Invisible (Radio Edit)" – 4:30
 "Almost Full Moon" – 3:42
 "Beyond the Invisible (Album Version)" – 5:05
 "Light of Your Smile" – 5:10
 "Beyond the Invisible (Short Radio Edit)" – 3:42

Charts

References 

 Ye Min Than (Nov. 5, 1996). Review of "Beyond The Invisible". Retrieved Aug. 21, 2005.
 Joar Grimstvedt (Oct. 12, 1996). Enigma: Beyond The Invisible. Retrieved Aug. 21, 2005.

Enigma (German band) songs
1996 singles
Songs written by Michael Cretu
Music videos directed by Julien Temple
1996 songs
Song recordings produced by Michael Cretu
Number-one singles in Greece